Over My Dead Body is the seventh Nero Wolfe detective novel by Rex Stout. The story first appeared in abridged form in The American Magazine (September 1939). The novel was published in 1940 by Farrar & Rinehart, Inc.

Plot introduction

In Over My Dead Body Rex Stout begins to explore Wolfe's Montenegrin background. By 1939, of course, the Wolfe/Goodwin books had become an established series but Wolfe's youth had yet to be clarified. Stout starts to do so in this book by bringing in a number of European visitors, including some from Montenegro; the backdrop is the maneuvers of the Axis and Allied powers to dominate Yugoslavia. In the first chapter Wolfe tells FBI Agent Stahl that he was born in the United States—a declaration at odds with all other references in the corpus. Stout's authorized biographer John McAleer explained the reason for the anomaly:

Rex told me that even in 1939 Wolfe was irked by the FBI's consuming curiosity about the private business of law-abiding citizens. In consequence, Wolfe felt under no constraint to tell the truth about himself when interrogated by Stahl. There was, however, another reason for Wolfe's contradictory statements about his place of origin. Rex explained: "Editors and publishers are responsible for the discrepancy. … In the original draft of Over My Dead Body Nero was a Montenegrin by birth, and it all fitted previous hints as to his background; but violent protests from The American Magazine, supported by Farrar & Rinehart, caused his cradle to be transported five thousand miles. … I got tired of all the yapping, and besides it seemed highly improbable that anyone would give a damn, or even, for that matter, ever notice it."

Plot summary

Nero Wolfe is approached by Carla Lovchen, a young fencing instructor and illegal immigrant from Montenegro, on behalf of her co-worker and fellow “alien”, Neya Tormic. Neya has been wrongfully accused of stealing diamonds out of the coat pockets of Nat Driscoll, a wealthy student at the fencing studio where she and Carla work. However, Wolfe reacts with unusual hostility to Carla’s presence, storming out of the room and refusing to even consider her request. 

After Carla leaves, Wolfe realises that she had an ulterior motive for visiting him; she has hidden a letter inside a book in Wolfe’s office. The letter, written in Serbo-Croatian, empowers Princess Vladanka Donevich, a Croatian aristocrat, to secretly negotiate with a foreign power over the rights to Yugoslavian forestry interests. When Carla returns, once more demanding Wolfe’s help, she shocks both Wolfe and Archie with a revelation — Neya claims to be Wolfe’s long-lost daughter, and has an adoption certificate as proof. Although skeptical, Wolfe admits that he adopted an orphan girl during his military service in Montenegro but lost contact with her during the political upheavals following the First World War. Nevertheless, Neya’s arrest would prove an embarrassing scandal for Wolfe, and he agrees to assist her.

Archie is sent to the fencing studio to investigate and meets Neya. Soon after, a British student at the studio named Percy Ludlow claims that Neya was simply recovering cigarettes from his coat, which is similar to Driscoll's. Archie is surprised when Neya seems more confused than relieved by Ludlow providing her an alibi, but the matter is quickly resolved when Driscoll arrives, sheepishly confessing that the diamonds had never been stolen in the first place; he had simply forgotten where he had left them.

Wolfe asks Archie to bring Neya to him, meaning that Archie is present in the studio when Percy Ludlow is found dead, killed with an épée. Although the studio’s swords are blunted, the murderer has stolen a device called a col de mort that can be attached to one, turning it into a deadly weapon. As the police arrive, Archie discovers that his coat has been tampered with; suspecting that the murderer has planted the col de mort on him, he slips away and heads back to the brownstone, where he and Wolfe confirm his suspicions.

Neya Tormic is initially the main suspect in Ludlow’s murder; she was his fencing instructor and the last person seen with him. Although another student, Rudolf Faber, has provided her an alibi, it is weak. Her guilt seems to be confirmed when Madame Zorka, a mysterious Manhattan couturière who also studies at the studio, calls Wolfe claiming to have seen Neya plant the col de mort. Although Zorka threatens to call the police, Wolfe calls her bluff by summoning her, Neya and the police to his office to reveal what has happened. Madam Zorka disappears, but Neya confesses that she did plant the col de mort on Archie, claiming that it had already been planted on her and she merely panicked.

Inspector Cramer, already annoyed by Wolfe and Archie’s intrusion into the case, is further aggrieved when powerful interests begin to interfere with his investigation. Ludlow is revealed to be a British agent on confidential business, leading Wolfe to suspect that he was investigating the Yugoslavian forestry deal. His suspicions are confirmed when Rudolf Faber visits his office, claiming to be acting in Neya’s interests; when Archie and Wolfe both leave the office, Faber instantly tries to locate the letter in the book it was left in. 

Donald Barrett, a banker and fencing student, approaches Wolfe also claiming to be acting in Neya’s interests. Barrett is the son of John Barrett, one of the partners of the firm involved in the deal, and Wolfe realizes that he is responsible for Madame Zorka’s disappearance. As the firm’s involvement with the deal is illegal under American law, Wolfe threatens to expose them unless Barrett produces Zorka. Capitulating, Barrett takes Archie to a love nest where he is housing Zorka. Wolfe attempts to question Zorka but she is apparently heavily intoxicated and incoherent. Wolfe eventually allows her to remain in the brownstone so that she can sleep it off, but when Archie goes to wake her the next morning he discovers she has slipped out via the fire escape. She is later found and brought back, where Saul Panzer reveals he has discovered her true identity - she is actually Pansy Bupp, a farm girl from Iowa who reinvented herself as Zorka in the hopes of achieving more success. 

Neya demands the letter from Wolfe, who refuses to surrender except it with Carla as she was the one who hid it. Archie is sent with Neya and the letter to the apartment the two immigrants share, but when they arrive they discover Rudolf Faber murdered on the floor. Carla has fled, seemingly guilty, but Archie discovers that the police have managed to trace her to an office building where Nat Driscoll’s business is located; Driscoll is sheltering her. Archie contacts Carla and convinces her to come to Wolfe’s office, sneaking her away from the police by disguising her as a hotel bellboy.

Wolfe apparently surrenders the letter to Neya Tormic, who leaves with a police escort. Once she has gone, Wolfe reveals that Neya is actually the murderer; she is the Princess Vladanka, posing as an immigrant as cover for her deal with Faber. Ludlow uncovered her true identity, prompting Neya to murder him out of a panicked impulse. Faber discovered this and began to blackmail her for more favourable terms, leading Neya to murder him as well. The letter Wolfe gave her was actually a note informing her that she was no longer his client. Infuriated, Neya slips her escort and returns to attack Wolfe, but is killed when Wolfe cracks a beer bottle over her head in defense. Later, Wolfe reveals to Carla that he has realized that she is in fact his adopted daughter, and offers to support her in America.

Cast of characters
Nero Wolfe — Famous detective
Archie Goodwin — Wolfe's young assistant, and the narrator of all Wolfe stories
Carla Lovchen — Beautiful Montenegrin girl
Neya Tormic — Carla's emotional friend and Wolfe's client
Nikola Miltan — Macedonian épée champion, owner of a fencing and dancing studio in Manhattan where Tormic and Lovchen work
Jeanne Miltan — His wife
John P. Barrett — Wealthy international banker, involved with intrigues and secret transactions involving royal holdings in Bosnia
Donald Barrett — His son
Madame Zorka — Couturière, client of Miltan's studio, and business associate of Donald Barrett
Inspector Cramer — Head of the New York Police Department's homicide squad
Nat Driscoll, Rudolph Faber, Percy Ludlow — Fencing students at Miltan's studio
Saul Panzer, Fred Durkin, Orrie Cather — Freelance detectives employed by Wolfe

Fair use
The following excerpt from Over My Dead Body was used as the quotation in a New York Times Sunday acrostic: "When an international financier is confronted by a holdup man [with a gun], he automatically hands over not only his money and jewelry but also his shirt and pants, [because] it doesn't occur to him that a robber might draw the line somewhere." (The bracketed words did not appear in the acrostic.)

Reviews and commentary
 Isaac Anderson, The New York Times Book Review (January 7, 1940) — There is more of Archie Goodwin than of Nero Wolfe in this book, and that is all to the good, for, although Wolfe is Archie's boss and the one who does the heavy thinking, Archie is, unless our guess is wide of the mark, the person whom readers of the Nero Wolfe stories take to their hearts. If Nero is the brains of the concern, Archie is its arms and hands and legs. When Nero wants something done, he does not need to tell Archie how to do it. Archie will figure that out for himself, and the thing is as good as done, however difficult the assignment may be. In the murder case with which this story deals there are international complications which make things unusually difficult. The police and the G-men are in it too, but the best that they can do is to watch Nero Wolfe and wait for him to come through with the solution. The book is full of surprises for everybody concerned, including not only the reader but also the police, Archie and even Nero Wolfe himself. Read one chapter of this book and you will need no urging to go on with it.
 Jacques Barzun and Wendell Hertig Taylor, A Catalogue of Crime — This is the tale in which we learn that Nero has been married, has adopted a daughter in his native Montenegro, and has become a U.S. citizen in order to enjoy peace and democracy. The plot hinges on international and domestic secrets but it is sober and sound. Archie, Cramer, and the rest of the cast are in top form, and Nero is noticeably more outspoken and impulsive than he subsequently became.
 J. Kenneth Van Dover, At Wolfe's Door — The first half dozen Wolfe novels established the detective as an original creation. Over My Dead Body begins the long line of pleasant entertainments in which Wolfe and Archie exploit the familiar formulas.

Adaptations

A Nero Wolfe Mystery (A&E Network)
An adaptation of Over My Dead Body concluded the first season of the A&E TV series A Nero Wolfe Mystery (2001–2002). Sharon Elizabeth Doyle and Janet Roach wrote the teleplay for the episode, which was directed by Timothy Hutton. "Over My Dead Body" made its debut in two one-hour episodes airing July 8 and 15, 2001, on A&E.

Timothy Hutton is Archie Goodwin; Maury Chaykin is Nero Wolfe. Other members of the cast (in credits order) are Bill Smitrovich (Inspector Cramer), Ron Rifkin (Nikola Miltan), Colin Fox (Fritz Brenner), James Tolkan (Percy Ludlow), George Plimpton (John Barrett). Kari Matchett (Carla Lovchen), Debra Monk (Madame Zorka), Francie Swift (Neya Tormic), Trent McMullen (Orrie Cather), Conrad Dunn (Saul Panzer), Robert Bockstael (Agent Stahl), Nicky Guadagni (Jeanne Miltan), Hrant Alianak (Nat Driscoll), R.D. Reid (Sergeant Purley Stebbins), Richard Waugh (Rudolph Faber), Dina Barrington (Belinda Reade) and Boyd Banks (Duncan Barrett, the same character called "Donald Barrett" in the original novel, yet, oddly, still referred to as "Donny-Bonny" in the teleplay's dialog by Belinda Reade, Madame Zorka, and sarcastically by Archie, just as in the novel).

In addition to original music by Nero Wolfe composer Michael Small, the soundtrack includes music by Johannes Brahms (opening sequence), Ib Glindemann, Jacques Offenbach and David Steinberg.

In North America, A Nero Wolfe Mystery is available on Region 1 DVD from A&E Home Video. "Over My Dead Body" is divided into two parts as originally broadcast on A&E.

"Over My Dead Body" is one of the Nero Wolfe episodes released on Region 2 DVD in the Netherlands by Just Entertainment, under license from FremantleMedia Enterprises. A Nero Wolfe Mystery — Serie 2 (2010) was the first DVD release of the international version of the episode, which presents "Over My Dead Body" as a 90-minute film with a single set of titles and credits. Included is a brief scene in which Archie and Fritz put Madame Zorka to bed in the south room. "Fritz is a real gentleman," Archie says in voiceover. "She may not have arrived with a nightie or a toothbrush, but for the honor of the house, by golly, she got orchids." The Netherlands release has optional Dutch subtitles and, like the A&E DVD release, presents the episode in 4:3 pan and scan rather than its 16:9 aspect ratio for widescreen viewing.

The adaptation is faithful to the novel save for a few changes in detail, such as Donald Barrett being renamed Duncan Barrett and Archie conscripting a bellboy at the Maidstone Building to provide his uniform for Carla Lovchen instead of phoning a nearby hotel and asking the house detective he knows there to send a bellboy over to make the switch with Carla. The script also contains a factual error: when Zorka is unmasked, Wolfe says she was born in "Ottumwa, Minnesota", instead of Ottumwa, Iowa, as in the novel.

Nero Wolfe (Radiotelevisione italiana S.p.A.) 
Over My Dead Body was adapted for the eighth episode of the RAI TV series Nero Wolfe (Italy 2012), starring Francesco Pannofino as Nero Wolfe and Pietro Sermonti as Archie Goodwin. Set in 1959 in Rome, where Wolfe and Archie reside after leaving the United States, the series was produced by Casanova Multimedia and Rai Fiction and directed by Riccardo Donna. "Coppia di spade" aired May 24, 2012.

Publication history
1939, The American Magazine, September 1939, abridged
1940, New York: Farrar & Rinehart, January 3, 1940, hardcover
In his limited-edition pamphlet, Collecting Mystery Fiction #9, Rex Stout's Nero Wolfe Part I, Otto Penzler describes the first edition of Over My Dead Body: "Turquoise cloth, front cover and spine printed with dark blue; rear cover blank. Issued in a full-color pictorial dust wrapper … The first edition has the publisher's monogram logo on the copyright page."
In April 2006, Firsts: The Book Collector's Magazine estimated that the first edition of Over My Dead Body had a value of between $4,000 and $7,500.
1940, New York: Omnibook Magazine, February 1940, abridged
1940, Toronto: Oxford University Press, 1940, hardcover
1940, London: Collins Crime Club, October 7, 1940, hardcover
1943, New York: Lawrence E. Spivak, Jonathan Press Mystery #J6, 1943, abridged, paperback
1945, New York: Avon #62, 1945, first unabridged paperback
1955, Harmondsworth, Middlesex: Penguin Books #1106, 1955, paperback
1965, London: Panther, February 1965, paperback
1979, New York: Jove #M4865, March 1979, paperback
1992, London: Scribners (Macdonald) "by arrangement with Bantam Books" , hardcover
1994, New York: Bantam Crimeline  January 1994, paperback, Rex Stout Library edition with introduction by John Jakes
2007, Auburn, California: The Audio Partners Publishing Corp., Mystery Masters  March 28, 2007, audio CD (unabridged, read by Michael Prichard)
2010, New York: Bantam  July 21, 2010, e-book

References

External links

 A Nero Wolfe Mystery — "Over My Dead Body" at The Wolfe Pack, official site of the Nero Wolfe Society

1940 American novels
Nero Wolfe novels by Rex Stout
Works originally published in The American Magazine
Farrar & Rinehart books
Novels set in Montenegro
American novels adapted into films